The 2019 Marshall Thundering Herd men's soccer team represented Marshall University during the 2019 NCAA Division I men's soccer season. It is the 41st season of the university fielding a men's varsity soccer program. The Thundering Herd, led by third-year head coach Chris Grassie, played their home games at Veterans Memorial Soccer Complex as members of Conference USA.

The 2019 season proved to be the program's most successful season at the time. Marshall finished as the Conference USA Men's Soccer Tournament and regular season champions making their first ever NCAA Tournament appearance. Marshall also was ranked in the Top 25 for the first time since 2001.

Roster 
Updated November 17, 2019

Schedule 

Source:

|-
!colspan=6 style=""| Regular season

|-
!colspan=6 style=""| Conference USA Tournament
|-

|-
!colspan=6 style=""| NCAA Tournament
|-

|-

Rankings

References 

2019
Marshall Thundering Herd
Marshall Thundering Herd
Marshall Thundering Herd men's soccer
Marshall Thundering Herd